Stoutenburg is a village in the Netherlands.

Stoutenburg or Stoutenburgh may also refer to:

Places

People
 Adrien Stoutenburg (1916-1982), American poet
 Isaac Stoutenburgh (1739–1799), New York politician

Other
 Stoutenburgh House, historic house in Pasadena, California
 Bergh–Stoutenburgh House, historic house in Hyde Park, New York
 William Stoutenburgh House, historic house in Hyde Park, New York